Sir Edward Bagot, 4th Baronet (21 January 1674 – May 1712) succeeded to the Baronetcy of Blithfield Hall, Staffordshire, on the death of his father Sir Walter Bagot in 1704.

He was educated at Christ Church, Oxford. He matriculated in 1691 and was admitted to the Middle Temple in 1692.

He served, like his father, as member of parliament for Staffordshire 1698–1708.

He married Frances Wagstaffe, daughter of Sir Thomas Wagstaffe, in 1697 and he was succeeded by his only son Walter.

See also
Baron Bagot

References 

1674 births
1712 deaths
Alumni of Christ Church, Oxford
Baronets in the Baronetage of England
Members of the Middle Temple
Members of the Parliament of Great Britain for English constituencies
British MPs 1707–1708
English MPs 1698–1700
English MPs 1701
English MPs 1701–1702
English MPs 1702–1705
English MPs 1705–1707